On Royalty: A Very Polite Inquiry into Some Strangely Related Families is a 2006 book by Jeremy Paxman that examines the ways in which the British Monarchy continues to hold to the public imagination.

2006 non-fiction books
British monarchy